The 1971 Rothmans International Vancouver – Doubles was an event of the 1971 Rothmans International Vancouver tennis tournament played at the PNE Agrodome in Vancouver, Canada from 3 October through 11 October 1971. Roy Emerson and Rod Laver were the defending doubles champions and retained the title, defeating John Alexander and Phil Dent in the final, 5–7, 6–7, 6–0, 7–5, 7–6.

Draw

References

External links
 ITF tournament edition details

1971 in Canadian tennis